Mandylor is a surname. Notable persons with that name include:
 Costas Mandylor (born 1965), Australian actor
 Louis Mandylor (born 1966), Australian actor